The white-breasted babbler (Stachyris grammiceps) is a species of bird in the family Timaliidae. It is endemic to the island of Java in Indonesia. Most records are from West Java.

Its natural habitat is subtropical or tropical moist lowland forest. It is threatened by habitat loss.

References

Collar, N. J. & Robson, C. 2007. Family Timaliidae (Babblers) pp. 70 – 291 in; del Hoyo, J., Elliott, A. & Christie, D.A. eds. Handbook of the Birds of the World, Vol. 12. Picathartes to Tits and Chickadees. Lynx Edicions, Barcelona.

white-breasted babbler
Birds of Java
white-breasted babbler
Taxonomy articles created by Polbot